Terrell County is a county located in the southwestern portion of the U.S. state of Georgia. As of the 2020 census, the population was 9,185. The county seat is Dawson.

Terrell County is included in the Albany, GA Metropolitan Statistical Area.

History
Formed from portions of Randolph and Lee Counties on February 16, 1856, by an act of the Georgia General Assembly, Terrell County is named for Dr. William Terrell (1778–1855) of Sparta, Georgia, who served in the Georgia General Assembly and the United States House of Representatives.

During the American Civil War, after Atlanta's capture by Union forces, a refugee settlement was established in Terrell County for civilians forced to flee the city. The Fosterville settlement, named after Georgia Quartermaster General Ira Roe Foster, was according to author Mary Elizabeth Massey in her 2001 history, the "most ambitious refugee project approved by the Georgia General Assembly" [during that period]. On March 11, 1865, the Georgia General Assembly authorized General Foster to "continue to provide for maintenance of said exiles, or such of them as are unable by their labor to support themselves, or their families for the balance of the present year."

During the civil rights era of the 1960s, the local white minority resisted change, sometimes violently; it subsequently became known as "Terrible Terrell County". In 1958 the county refused to register a group of African-Americans including several teachers with Bachelors and Masters degrees on the grounds that they couldn't read, and a college-educated marine who was refused registration on the grounds he could not write intelligibly. The case eventually reached the supreme court, and the county was ordered to allow them to register, but they did not immediately comply. In 1960, testimony showed that Black voters were given more tests, and more difficult tests, than White voters, and that illiterate Whites were allowed to vote, while well-educated Blacks were falsely determined to be illiterate. The county asserted that this was not discriminatory. In September 1962, an African-American church was burned down after it was used for voter registration meetings. (Note: Like other southern states, Georgia had disenfranchised most blacks at the turn of the century by rules raising barriers to voter registration; they were still excluded from the political system.) That month Prathia Hall delivered a speech at the site of the ruins, using the repeated phrase "I have a dream." Rev. Martin Luther King Jr. attended her speech; afterward, he also began to use that phrase, including in his noted "I Have a Dream" speech in 1963 at the Lincoln Memorial in Washington, DC.

Geography

The western and southern two-thirds of Terrell County is located in the Ichawaynochaway Creek sub-basin of the ACF River Basin (Apalachicola-Chattahoochee-Flint River Basin). The county's northeastern third is located in the Kinchafoonee-Muckalee sub-basin of the same larger ACF River Basin.

Major highways

  U.S. Route 82
  State Route 32
  State Route 41
  State Route 45
  State Route 49
  State Route 50
  State Route 55
  State Route 118
  State Route 520

Adjacent counties
 Webster County - north
 Sumter County - northeast
 Lee County - east
 Dougherty County - southeast
 Calhoun County - southwest
 Randolph County - west

Demographics

2020 census

As of the 2020 United States census, there were 9,185 people, 3,399 households, and 2,348 families residing in the county.

2010 census
As of the 2010 United States Census, there were 9,315 people, 3,519 households, and 2,450 families living in the county. The racial makeup of the county was 61.2% black or African American, 36.6% white, 0.3% Asian, 0.2% American Indian, 0.8% from other races, and 0.9% from two or more races. Those of Hispanic or Latino origin made up 1.7% of the population. In terms of ancestry, 8.7% were American, 5.7% were English, and 5.0% were Irish.

Of the 3,519 households, 33.7% had children under the age of 18 living with them, 40.2% were married couples living together, 24.4% had a female householder with no husband present, 30.4% were non-families, and 26.7% of all households were made up of individuals. The average household size was 2.57 and the average family size was 3.11. The median age was 39.6 years.

The median income for a household in the county was $27,909 and the median income for a family was $35,663. Males had a median income of $36,641 versus $25,461 for females. The per capita income for the county was $15,553. About 28.2% of families and 31.0% of the population were below the poverty line, including 44.4% of those under age 18 and 24.6% of those age 65 or over.

2000 census
As of the census of 2000, there were 10,970 people, 4,002 households, and 2,913 families living in the county. There were 4,460 housing units at an average density of 13 per square mile (5/km2). The racial makeup of the county was 60.69% Black or African American, 37.95% White, 0.20% Native American, 0.35% Asian, 0.03% Pacific Islander, 0.09% from other races, and 0.69% from two or more races.  1.24% of the population were Hispanic or Latino of any race.

There were 4,002 households, out of which 33.30% had children under the age of 18 living with them, 44.10% were married couples living together, 24.00% had a female householder with no husband present, and 27.20% were non-families. 24.30% of all households were made up of individuals, and 10.20% had someone living alone who was 65 years of age or older.  The average household size was 2.69 and the average family size was 3.18.

In the county, the population was spread out, with 28.40% under the age of 18, 9.50% from 18 to 24, 26.00% from 25 to 44, 23.20% from 45 to 64, and 13.00% who were 65 years of age or older.  The median age was 35 years. For every 100 females, there were 88.30 males.  For every 100 females age 18 and over, there were 82.60 males.

The median income for a household in the county was $26,969, and the median income for a family was $31,693. Males had a median income of $27,320 versus $19,895 for females. The per capita income for the county was $13,894.  About 22.70% of families and 28.60% of the population were below the poverty line, including 40.50% of those under age 18 and 22.00% of those age 65 or over.

Communities
 Bronwood
 Dawson
 Parrott
 Sasser

Notable people
 Benjamin J. Davis Jr., Harvard Law School graduate and elected to New York City Council. Defended Angelo Herndon in Georgia against insurrection charges for organizing a union, resulting in a U.S. Supreme Court case that ruled against Georgia's insurrection law as unconstitutional.
 Walter Washington, activist and politician, elected as the first black mayor of Washington, D.C. after Congress granted home rule to the city.
 Otis Redding, rhythm and blues singer; one of the first crossover artists appealing to both young blacks and whites in the post-World War II era.
 Cole Swindell, is an American country music singer and songwriter who attended Terrell Academy in Dawson, Georgia.

Politics
Terrell County has consistently been a Democratic county since the 1992 presidential election, though the margins have historically been close. In 1940, Franklin D. Roosevelt received 100% of all votes cast in Terrell County.

See also

 Dawson Five
 National Register of Historic Places listings in Terrell County, Georgia
 USS Terrell County (LST-1157)
List of counties in Georgia

References

External links
 terrellcounty.georgia.gov
 The New Georgia Encyclopedia Terrell County entry

 
1856 establishments in Georgia (U.S. state)
Georgia (U.S. state) counties
Albany metropolitan area, Georgia
Populated places established in 1856
Black Belt (U.S. region)
Majority-minority counties in Georgia